XETRA may refer to:

XEWW-AM, formerly XETRA, a commercial AM radio station in Baja California, Mexico
XETRA-FM, an English-language radio station in Baja California, Mexico
 Xetra (trading system), a trading venue operated by the Frankfurt Stock Exchange

See also
 Extra (disambiguation)